Jaroslav Kmiť (born September 12, 1979) is a Slovak professional ice hockey player who is currently a free agent.

He played in the Slovak Extraliga for HK Poprad and HK Poprad in the Slovak Extraliga during the 2010–11 season. He also played in Denmark's Metal Ligaen for AaB Ishockey, the MOL Liga for HSC Csíkszereda and the Kazakhstan Hockey Championship for Beibarys Atyrau.

External links

1979 births
Living people
AaB Ishockey players
Beibarys Atyrau players
HSC Csíkszereda players
HC Košice players
HK Poprad players
Slovak ice hockey left wingers
Sportspeople from Košice
Slovak expatriate ice hockey people
Slovak expatriate sportspeople in Kazakhstan
Expatriate ice hockey players in Kazakhstan
Expatriate ice hockey players in Romania
Slovak expatriate sportspeople in Romania
Slovak expatriate sportspeople in Denmark
Expatriate ice hockey players in Denmark